The Armed Forces Post Graduate Medical Institute, commonly referred to as AFPGMI, is a Postgraduate Medical Institute operated by the Pakistan Armed Forces. Its primary function is to provide graduate level medical education to physicians, surgeons, hospital administrators and nurses of Pakistan Armed Forces. It is headed by a Major General from the Medical Corps of the Pakistan Army.

History 

Armed Forces Post Graduate Medical Institute (AFPGMI) is the oldest post-graduate medical institute of the country. It was established on 18 August 1953 as the Army Medical Corps School at Lahore by integration of Hygiene and Malaria Wings of Pakistan Army Medical Corps.

In 1957, it was relocated to Rawalpindi under plans to establish a medical complex in the city.

The college was renamed as Armed Forces Medical College (AFM College) in September 1960 and finally assumed its current name in 1997.

AFPGMI was affiliated with the Quaid-i-Azam University as the degree awarding university since 1967. In 2015, AFPGMI was made a constituent college of National University of Medical Sciences.

Course Programs

Bachelor Programs 

 BSc Medical Laboratory
Technology (Hons)
 BSc Cardiac Perfusion (Hons)

Masters Programs 

 Master in Public Health (MPH)
 MSc Medical Administration
 MCPS Military Medicine

Doctor of Philosophy Programs 

 PhD Pharmacology
 PhD Pathology

AFPGMI also organizes specialized courses for Pakistan Armed Forces Officers as per specific requirements.

College of Nursing 

College of Nursing is a constituent institution of AFPGMI that offers medical education and degree programs relating to the field of Nursing.

In 1956, An institute for Basic and Post Basic Nursing Training was established at Combined Military Hospital Lahore as School of Nursing. It was shifted to Armed Forces Medical College (Now AFPGMI) in 1959. To meet the growing need for better qualified and educated nurses, a four-year Bachelors in Nursing Degree program was started in 2005. The college of nursing is accredited by the Pakistan Nursing Council and affiliated with National University of Medical Sciences as the degree awarding university.

It offers the following two degree programs:

 Generic Bachelor of Science in Nursing (Generic BSN)
 Post Registered Nurse - Bachelor of Science in Nursing (Post RN BSN)

See also 

 National University of Medical Sciences
 Pakistan Army Medical Corps
 College of Physicians and Surgeons Pakistan
 Pakistan Medical and Dental Council
 Pakistan Army

References 

Military education and training in Pakistan
Universities and colleges in Rawalpindi District
Military medicine in Pakistan